The 2016 Berserk anime series is based on the manga series of the same name by Kentaro Miura. The series uses four pieces of theme music, two opening and ending themes. Nagi Yanagi.

Episode list

Season 1 (2016)

Season 2 (2017)

See also
 List of Berserk (1997) episodes
 List of Berserk chapters

References

Berserk (manga)
Berserk (2016)